In mathematical genetics, a genetic algebra is a (possibly non-associative)  algebra used to model inheritance in genetics. Some variations of these algebras are called train algebras, special train algebras, gametic algebras, Bernstein algebras, copular algebras, zygotic algebras, and baric algebras (also called weighted algebra).

In applications to genetics, these algebras often have a basis corresponding to the genetically different gametes, and the structure constant of the algebra encode the probabilities of producing offspring of various types. The laws of inheritance are then encoded as algebraic properties of the algebra.

Baric algebras

A baric algebra over a field K is a possibly non-associative algebra over K together with a homomorphism w, called the weight, from the algebra to K.

Bernstein algebras

The Peirce decomposition of B corresponding to e is 

Copular algebras

Copular algebras  were introduced by

Evolution algebras

An evolution algebra over a field is an algebra with a basis on which multiplication is defined by the product of distinct basis terms being zero and the square of each basis element being a linear form in basis elements.  A real evolution algebra is one defined over the reals: it is non-negative if the structure constants in the linear form are all non-negative.  An evolution algebra is necessarily commutative and flexible but not necessarily associative or power-associative.

Gametic algebras

A gametic algebra is a finite-dimensional real algebra for which all structure constants lie between 0 and 1.

Genetic algebras

Genetic algebras were introduced by  who showed that special train algebras are genetic algebras and genetic algebras are train algebras.

Special train algebras

A special train algebra is a baric algebra in which the kernel N of the weight function is nilpotent and the principal powers of N are ideals.

 showed that special train algebras are train algebras.

Train algebras

The formal polynomial 

is a train polynomial.  The baric algebra B with weight w is a train algebra if

for all elements , with  defined as principal powers, .

Zygotic algebras

Zygotic algebras  were introduced by

References

.

Further reading
 

Population genetics
Non-associative algebras